Jecimauro José Borges (born 22 April 1980), commonly known as Jeci, is a Brazilian footballer who plays for Avaí as a central defender.

Career
Jeci enjoyed success with Coritiba Foot Ball Club, winning the Campeonato Brasileiro Série B twice (in 2007 and 2010) and the Campeonato Paranaense three times (in 2008, 2010 and 2011). In 2012, he moved to Japan where he would play with Kawasaki Frontale for three seasons.

References

External links
Porcopedia profile 

1980 births
Living people
Brazilian footballers
Association football defenders
Campeonato Brasileiro Série A players
Campeonato Brasileiro Série B players
Esporte Clube Taubaté players
Guaratinguetá Futebol players
Criciúma Esporte Clube players
Associação Atlética Portuguesa (Santos) players
Ituano FC players
Esporte Clube São Bento players
Clube do Remo players
Coritiba Foot Ball Club players
Sociedade Esportiva Palmeiras players
Avaí FC players
Grêmio Novorizontino players
J1 League players
Kawasaki Frontale players
Brazilian expatriate footballers
Brazilian expatriate sportspeople in Japan
Expatriate footballers in Japan